Same !@#$ Different Day is a compilation album by Lyrics Born. It was released on Quannum Projects in 2005. It peaked at number 27 on the Billboard Heatseekers Albums chart, as well as number 28 on the Independent Albums chart.

Release
As well as containing new tracks, Same !@#$ Different Day contains new lyrics over remixed beats from Lyrics Born's 2003 debut album, Later That Day. Some versions of the album includes a bonus DVD, featuring music videos, a documentary, and footage from the 2004 tour.

Critical reception

Dave Dierksen of PopMatters gave the album 7 stars out of 10, saying: "This is the sound of soul, and it's what's been missing for far too long in hip-hop." Vish Khanna of Exclaim! called it "an essential album for both old and new fans of Lyrics Born."

Track listing

Charts

References

External links
 

2005 compilation albums
Lyrics Born albums
Quannum Projects albums
Albums produced by Dan the Automator
Albums produced by DJ Shadow